Karabayır can refer to:

 Karabayır, Bozüyük
 Karabayır, Çameli
 Karabayır, Çorum
 Karabayır, Korkuteli